Alexander Romanovich Oligerov(born February 22, 1965, Temirtau, Russia) is a Russian artist and a member of the Russian Union of Artists.

Biography
Alexander Oligerov was born in 1965. In 1985 he graduated from Donetsk State Art Institute with honors, faculty of design. In 1993 he graduated from Russian State Pedagogical University in St.Petersbourg, faculty of Graphical Art. 
Since 1992 he has been the member f the International Federation of Artists attached to UNESCO. 
Since 2000 he has been the member of the Russian Union of Artists.
Since 2009 he has been the member of Paris Unit of Artist “Les Seize Anges”
 He teaches painting in Novgorod State University, he is the associate professor of faculty of the Fine arts. He has worked abroad, speaks English.
In 2004 at the international festival of arts "Master-class" in St.-Petersburg (president of festival was director of State Hermitage Dr. Mikhail Piatrovsky), Alexander Oligerov has won the first prize " Cap of the professional " in "The best painting"  nomination.
In 2006 Russian State Academy of Art has awarded him the silver medal of academy (for his pictures on the exhibition "250 years of Russian State Academy of Art).“What really wins over in the works of Alexander Oligerov – that is the fact that he does not dresses up in anything. Because of wit brains or simple-heartedness he happily and seriously makes a declaration of love to the subject. A Man surpassed modernism. He could go further by the crooked and smooth path of contemporary Art, but thought it out and stayed in bounders oil Painting. His choice (I hope, deliberate). His right.” Marina Koldobskaya, “The New World of Art” journal 4 (1999), Saint-Petersburg.
In September 2007, in Paris at the "Meeting of the artists from five continents" (where the artist's paintings were passing two rounds of the French competition) Oligerov's paintings were represent the fine arts of Europe, among other 100 artists from all over the world.
In 2011 at the international web competition of contemporary Russian artists in Italy "Made in Russia" (in the Russian year in Italy), Alexander Oligerov has won the first prize and then works of Alexander Oligerov represented contemporary Russian art on the exhibition in Milan (in gallery "Open Art Milan")
 In 2011 at the Moscow international competition "Art-Preview" Alexander Oligerov has won a prize of magazine “Russian art” 
 In 2014, the St. Petersburg Museum of Contemporary Art "Erarta" presented Oligerov's work in London gallery of ""Erartaa museum.
 In 2016 year at the biggest international competition of arts in Asia "Art Revolution Taipei" Alexander Oligerov has won the Grand prize and Prize of Chairman of Jury (all prizes of the competition).
Oligerov's pictures are in a collections of the state museum of the Russian Academy of arts (Moscow); of the Museum of nonconformist's art of Art-center “Pushkinskaya 10”  (St. Petersburg); of the State regional Novgorod's museum of art. In private collections, greatest of which is the collection of vice-president of corporation  “Samsung " Mr. Li Gil Han (more than 40 pictures)

Selected solo exhibitions
1997-1999 —  exhibitions in «Stallen Gallery» Fredrikstad, Norway;
2000 —  exhibition in «Crosna Gallery», Moscow;
2000 — exhibition in grand-hotel «Europe», St. Petersburg;
2001 —  exhibition at university of Strasbourg, France; 
2002 – exhibition in Russian Art Centre of Helsinki, Finland
2002 – exhibition in “Paradise Gallery”, Moscow.
2003 – exhibition in gallery “EXPO-88”, Moscow.
2007 – exhibition in gallery “BBK” Bielefeld, Germany
2008 –1009 exhibitions in gallery “Gavart” Paris
2009 – exhibition in international movie-festival “Cinema about the sea” in Sankt-Petersburg  
2010 – personal exhibition in hotel “Ritz” (Moscow) 
2010 — personal show in Krouvi exhibition halls in Lappeenranta /Finland/
2012 — solo exhibition in Museum of nonconformism art, Art-center «Pushkinskaya 10», Sankt-Petersburg, Russia;
2012 – solo exhibition in “Nest Pop Up gallery” (Geneva, Switzerland)
2013 — «Artistes Sentinelles»;International exhibition of Paris Union of artists "Les Seize Anges" Paris, France
2013 — solo exhibition in «Al gallery», St. Petersburg;
2014 — solo exhibition in «exhibition center ArtPlay», «East meets west Gallery» Moscow;
2015 – solo exhibition in exhibition hall of Moscow Artists Union, Moscow 
2016 — solo exhibition in «Master Gallery», «38 steps to the White» St. Petersburg; 
2016 — solo exhibition in «St. Petersburg Museum of Contemporary Art "Erarta"», «Color dreams» St. Petersburg; 
2016 — solo exhibition in "Art Zone 798” («Zoya Art Gallery»), Beijing (China); 2017 - solo exhibition in Art-Fair "Art Revolution Taipei" (as winner of the A.R.T. 2016)).

Selected group exhibitions
1989 – First exhibition of young artists “Out of genre” Moscow–Leningrad (the palace of Youth), Moscow
1994 - auction of Russian artists in "Pyramid Art Centre", Rochester, USA
1999 – exhibition of artists from St. Petersburg in the Scientific Research Institute of Fine Art in Moscow
1998-2000, 2004, 2008 — international Festival “Master class”, Manege, St. Petersburg
1998-2000 — International «Art Saloon», Central House of Artists, Moscow.
2005 – “60 years of Great Victory in the second War”, Central House of Artists, Moscow.
2006 – exhibition “250 years of Fine Arts Academy of Russia” , St. Petersburg
2007- International Art-Fair «Open Art. Five Continents Artists Meeting», Atelier Grognard Rueil Malmaison (France).
2008 – International exhibition in Pommern's Center of Art (Graiwsfald, Germany)
2008 - International exhibition of The Lady Between The Lines Art Agency in “Modern Art Gallery” (Los Angeles)
2008 - international exhibition "BUILDING BRIDGES": Artexchange Mexico/USA 2008/2009/2010 . First exhibition of project is CEARTE Cultural Art Center, Ensenada, Baja California, Mexico.
2009 - - international exhibition "BUILDING BRIDGES": Artexchange Mexico/United States .ICBC, Institute of Culture of Tijuana, Baja California, Mexico.
2009 - - international exhibition "BUILDING BRIDGES": Artexchange Mexico/USA Center of the Arts, Mexicali, Mexico (Next part of project will be in capital of Mexico, San Francisco and Los-Angeles )
2011 - exhibition of contemporary Russian artists in Milan “Made in Russia” (gallery "Open Art Milan"), Italy
2012 – art exhibition at the 32nd international Hanseatic Days, Lueneburg, Germany
2013 – “Artistes Sentinelles” International exhibition of Paris Union of artists "Les Seize Anges" Paris, France
2016 - International art fair ”;Art Revolution Taipei” Trade center ”101” Taipei (Taiwan)

Famous art-projects
"Red room" 
Idea of art-project: Red it is force and the power, riches and blood, Energy of movement and categorical interdiction. 
In a word red is a life. 
"Black water and white water"
Idea of art-project: The most part of our planet is covered with water. The most part of a human body consists of water. Water gives a human a life, but can take away it. Black water is a substance, which capable to wash and remove all systems and borders, White water gives for all us chance to start from white sheet again.

"The stone garden"
Idea of art-project: Who knows, probably, our Universe is only a stone garden, placed by the Founder in space
emptiness in an ideal order and harmony, probably it is a place for His meditation.

 "The dedication to unwritten verses"    
Conception of art-project : It often happens that ingenious poems which we could have written are crossed out by life, but history would not permit subjunctive mood. In this project the author is trying to lift the veil of might-have-been events. Uncreated images and crossed out scraps of unwritten poems are sweeping past him like shadows. The artist, like an archaeologist, is trying to remove the topcoat of daily occurrence under which our dreams are buried.

  "MOVEMENT TO THE WHITE COLOR"     
Idea of art-project. 
The artist, in this art collection, considers White color not as color (or its absence), but as a light, a spiritual reference point to which each person should aspire. Movement to white is a movement from infinitely viscous terrestrial passions to a spiritual enlightenment.

  «My correspondence with bees»    
Idea of a cycle of works - if you want to get a dolce vita, it is necessary to have the negotiations with bees.

 "Three minutes before sunrise" 
This Art-project is illustration of Dante's Divine Comedy: The vision of hell "In the midway of this our mortal life, 
I found me in a gloomy wood, astray...

 "Fresh breeze" 
The author says that any wind can blow in your sails, but only the Fresh breeze will lead the Ship of your main dream directly to the purpose.

 "Color dream" 
Creating the new reality, each artist, as a matter of fact, acquaints us with the new parallel world which move to us as a color dream.

 «By the way, about birdies»
If you were sometime taking in your hand a small bird, probably, remember how it was fragile and how bird strongly aspired to a freedom.

References 

 http://www.seizeanges.com/oligerov_fr.html
 http://www.rg.ru/2014/01/30/reg-szfo/oligerov.html
 
 http://www.snob.ru/profile/27429/blog/68840
 http://www.artpreview.ru/Info/priz2011
 Official site http://www.oligerov.ru/01/01start.html
 Interview for RG http://www.rg.ru/2014/01/30/reg-szfo/oligerov.html
 Interview for "Snob" journal http://www.snob.ru/profile/27429/blog/68840

21st-century Russian painters
Russian male painters
1965 births
Living people
Abstract painters
21st-century Russian male artists